The Roman Catholic Diocese of Sant Feliu de Llobregat  is a diocese located in the city of Sant Feliu de Llobregat in the Ecclesiastical province of Barcelona in Spain.

History
 15 June 2004: Established as Diocese of Sant Feliu de Llobregat from the Metropolitan Archdiocese of Barcelona

Special churches
Minor Basilica, National Shrine:
 Basílica de Mare de Déu de Montserrat, Montserrat, Catalonia
Minor Basilica:
 Basílica de Santa Maria, Vilafranca del Penedès, Catalonia

Leadership
Agustín Cortés Soriano (15 June 2004 – present)

See also
Roman Catholicism in Spain

Sources
 GCatholic.org
 Catholic Hierarchy
 Diocese website 

Roman Catholic dioceses in Catalonia
Roman Catholic dioceses in Spain
Christian organizations established in 2004
Roman Catholic dioceses and prelatures established in the 21st century